Barbara Lison (born 2 October 1956) is a German librarian. She has led the Bremen public library service for thirty years. She was elected to lead the International Federation of Library Associations and Institutions (IFLA) for 2021–2023.

Life
Lison was born in Zbrosławice in Poland in 1956. She studied Slavic studies, history and educational science at Ruhr University Bochum. She initially taught Russian in Düsseldorf followed by a student traineeship in and then a library traineeship in Bochum, Oldenburg and Cologne while working as a librarian. In 1986 she was in Dortmund at the Federal Institute for Industrial Health and Safety Standards.

In 1987 she was appointed to lead the city library in Oldenburg. In 1992 she became director of the Bremen City Library. There are nine city libraries in Bremen.

She initially became involved with the IFLA while organising a successful bid to host the World Library and Information Congress in Berlin in 2003.

In 2016 she became the 's president for three years until after about twenty years of involvement with the IFLA, including being the treasurer, she stood for election to that organisation's president elect for two years. That started in 2019 and then became the president for 2021–2023. She had already been involved with a free e-lending scheme and her focus points included open-access and fair copyright.

In an interview she said her favourite book was Roald Dahl's Matilda because it told the story of a girl who succeeds with the aid of a teacher and a librarian.

References

1956 births
Living people
People from Tarnowskie Góry County
German women librarians
German librarians
Ruhr University Bochum alumni